Arnoldo Foà  (24 January 1916 – 11 January 2014) was an Italian actor, voice actor, theatre director, singer and writer. He appeared in more than 130 films between 1938 and 2014.

Biography
Foà was born in Ferrara, Italy, to a Jewish family, though Foà was an atheist in his adult life. Foà completed high school in Florence, where he moved with his family, and studied at the acting school of Rasi. He abandoned his studies in economics and at age 20 moved to Rome, where he attended the Centro Sperimentale di Cinematografia.

He was initiated to the Italian Scottish Rite Freemasonry in 1947 at the Lodge "Alpi Giulie" n.150 (in Rome), taking later the highest degree.

Foà died on 11 January 2014 from respiratory failure, just 13 days short of his 98th birthday.

Theatre

1930s
 La serenata al vento by Carlo Veneziani, directed by Alberto Bracaloni, 1935
 La dodicesima notte by William Shakespeare, directed by Pietro Sharoff, 1938
 L’Alcalde di Zalamea by Calderón de la Barca, directed by 
 Rappresentazione di Santo Ignazio (Anonimo del XV secolo), directed by G. Pacuvio, 1939
 Frenesia by Charles de Peyret-Chappuis, directed by Edoardo Anton
 La vita è sogno by Calderon de la Barca, directed by Nino Meloni
 Le Allegre Comari di Windsor by William Shakespeare, directed by Pietro Scharoff

1940s
 I Masnadieri by Friedrich Schiller, directed by Guido Salvini, 1941
 L’Arco di Ulisse by Gerhart Hauptmann
 La Nascita di Salomè, directed by 
 La ragazza indiavolata by Ralph Benatzky, Teatro Quirino, 1943
 La Parte di Marito by Vincenzo Tieri
 La Vedova Allegra, by Franz Lehár
 Il Marchese di Priolà by Henry Lavedan
 Non Rinuncio all’Amore by Giovanni Bokay
 Papà by Gaston Arman De Caillavet and Robert De Flers
 Piccoli Traguardi by 
 La brava gente by Irwin Shaw, directed by Jean Giraudoux, Teatro Eliseo, 1945
 La luna è tramontata by John Steinbeck, directed by Vito Pandolfi, (Teatro Quirino di Roma, 15 febbraio)
 Arsenico e vecchi merletti by Joseph Kesselring, directed by Ettore Giannini
 La bella avventura by Caillavet e De Flers, directed by Ettore Giannini
 Parenti Terribili by Jean Cocteau, directed by Luchino Visconti, Compagnia del Teatro Eliseo
 Enrico IV by Luigi Pirandello
 La quinta colonna by Ernest Hemingway, directed by Luchino Visconti, Compagnia del Teatro Eliseo di Roma
 La via del tabacco Jack Kirkland (from novel of Erskine Caldwell), directed by Luchino Visconti, Teatro Quirino of Roma 16 April 1946
 Mia sorella Evelina by J. Fields e J. Chodorov, directed by Guido Salvini
 Susanna e i peccatori directed by Tullio Carminati
 Delitto e castigo by Gaston Baty (Fyodor Dostoyevsky), directed by Luchino Visconti
 La Madre degli emigranti by Turi Vasile and Alberto Perrini, directed by Nino Meloni, 6 luglio
 Il Ritratto di Dorian Gray by Oscar Wilde, directed by Guido Salvini, Teatro Quirino
 Incantesimo by Philip Barry, directed by Gerardo Guerrieri, Teatro delle Arti, Rome, 7 febbraio
 Appuntamento a Senlis by Jean Anouilh, directed by Guido Salvini, 1947
 La fine della Signora Cheiney by Frederick Lonsdale
 Sposateci, Signore...! by Jean de Létraz, directed by 
 L’Uomo e il Fucile by Sergio Sollima, directed by Luigi Squarzina, Praga
 Cristo ha ucciso by Gian Paolo Callegari, directed by Guido Salvini, Compagnia Straordinaria di G. Salvini, Teatro La Fenice di Venezia, 1948
 Una bella domenica di settembre by Ugo Betti, directed by Turi Vasile, Teatro Quirino di Roma
 Edipo Re di Eschilo, directed by Guido Salvini, Comp. Straordinaria di G. Salvini, Teatro Olimpico di Vicenza
 Scendete..vi chiamano by Jean De Letraz, directed by 
 Stefano by Jacques Déval, directed by 
 Il regno animale by Philip Barry, directed by Luigi Squarzina
 La notte del 16 gennaio by Ayn Rand, directed by Guglielmo Cortese, Teatro Quirino
 Giulio Cesare by William Shakespeare, directed by Guido Salvini, Compagnia del Festival Drammatico, 
 Medea di Euripides, directed by Guido Salvini, 
 Le Mani Sporche by Jean-Paul Sartre, directed by 
 L’Avaro by Molière, directed by Luciano Salvi, Teatro Ateneo
 Vivere Così by Dino Falconi
 Proibito al Pubblico by Rogers Dornès and Jean Marsan, directed by 
 I Masnadieri by Friedrich Schiller, directed by Guido Salvini

1950s
 I Persiani by Eschilo directed by Luigi Squarzina, Greek Theatre of Syracuse, 12 maggio 1950
 Le Baccanti by Euripides, directed by Luigi Squarzina, Greek Theatre of Syracuse
 Peer Gynt by Henrik Ibsen, directed by Vittorio Gassman, Compagnia del Teatro nazionale, Teatro Valle di Roma
 Sophonisba by Giangiorgio Trissino, directed by Giorgio Strehler, 
 Antigone by Sophocles, directed by Guido Salvini, 
 Commedia degli Straccioni by Annibal Caro, directed by Guido Salvini, Compagnia Teatro Nazionale
 Caterina da Siena by Cesare Vico Ludovici, directed by Fernando De Crucciati
 I Fratelli by Publius Terentius Afer, directed by Luigi Squarzina, Teatro Greco di Acrae
 La Cameriera Brillante by Carlo Goldoni, directed by Lucio Chiavarelli
 Anna per mille giorni by Maxwell Anderson, directed by Guido Salvini, Teatro Valle, 1951
 Detective story, by Sidney Kingsley, directed by Luigi Squarzina, Compagnia del Teatro Nazionale
 Il libro di Cristoforo Colombo by Paul Claudel, directed by Guido Salvini
 Giulietta e Romeo by William Shakespeare, directed by Guido Salvini, Teatro Valle
 La Casa Nova by Carlo Goldoni, directed by Carlo Lodovici, Teatro di Palazzo Grassi (Venezia)
 Un mese in campagna by Ivan Turgenev, directed by Orazio Costa, Teatro Odeon di Milano, 1952
 Lazzaro by Luigi Pirandello, directed by Claudio Fino, Compagnia Pagnani
 La Fiaccola sotto il moggio by Gabriele D'Annunzio, directed by Corrado Pavolini
 Chéri by Léopold Marchand (of Colette), directed by André Barsacq, Compagnia Italiana di Prosa, Teatro Duse
 Amphitryon by Plautus, directed by Jean Giraudoux, comp. Teatro Eliseo of Roma, Palazzo dei Diamanti a Ferrara, 1955
 Pseudolus by Plautus, directed by Giulio Pacuvio, Compagnia del Dramma Antico, Teatro Romano di Ostia
 Le Nuvole by Aristofanes, directed by Giulio Pacuvio, Compagnia del Dramma Antico, Teatro Romano di Ostia
 Veglia d’armi by D. Fabbri, directed by Orazio Costa, Istituto Dramma Popolare, Teatro Olimpia di Milano, 1956
 Paura di me by V. Bompiani, directed by Daniele D’Anza, Comp. Teatrale Italiana Teatro delle Arti
 Noi due by Alessandro De Stefani, directed by Mario Landi, Compagnia Teatrale Italiana, Teatro delle Arti of Roma
 La professione della signora Warren by George Bernard Shaw, directed by Mario Ferrero, Compagnia Pagnani-Villi-Foà, Teatro Eliseo of Roma
 Adorabile Giulia of Marc Gilbert Sauvajon, directed by Daniele D'Anza, Compagnia Pagnani-Villi-Foà-Ferzetti, Teatro Eliseo of Roma
 Musica di foglie morte by Pier Maria Rosso di San Secondo, directed by Alberto Gagliardelli
 Casa di Bambola by Henrik Ibsen, directed by Luciano Lucignani
 Ma non è una cosa seria by Luigi Pirandello, directed by Luigi Squarzina, comp. Pagnani-Villi-Foà-Ferzetti, 1957
 Signori buonasera by A. Foà, directed by A. Foà, Compagnia Pagnani-Villi-Foà-Ferzetti, Teatro Odeon di Milano
 La figlia di Jorio by Gabriele D'Annunzio, directed by Luigi Squarzina
 La Commedia degli Equivoci by W. Shakespeare, directed by Mario Ferrero, 1958
 Racconto d’Inverno by William Shakespeare, directed by Guido Salvini, 1959
 Commedia degli Straccioni by Annibal Caro, directed by Guido Salvini
  by Plautus, directed by 

1960s
 Due in altalena by William Gibson, directed by A. Foà, Teatro Eliseo di Roma, 1960
 La terra è rotonda by Armand Salacrou directed by Roberto Guicciardini
 Giulietta e Romeo by W. Shakespeare, directed by Franco Enriquez, Teatro Romano di Verona
 Rashomon di Fay e Kanin, (dal film di Akira Kurosawa), directed by Arnoldo Foà, 1961
 I Turchi se la giocano a primiera by Alfio Beretta, directed by Arnoldo Foà, Teatro Nuovo di Milano
 Un giorno nella vita di ...  by Jack Popplewell, directed by Umberto Benedetto, Piccolo Teatro Stabile della città di Firenze
 Anfitrione by Plautus, directed by Silverio Blasi, Centro Teatrale Italiano, 1962
 Ifigenia by Ildebrando Pizzetti e Alberto Perrini, directed by Aldo Vassallo Mirabella, Teatro dell’Opera di Roma
 Il Pipistrello by Johann Strauss Jr, directed by Herbert Graf, Direttore d’orchestra Samuel Krachmalnick, regia teatrale Arnoldo Foà, Teatro dell’Opera di Roma
 I Masteroidi by Marcel Aymè, directed by A. Foà, 1963
 Notti a Milano by Carlo Terron, directed by A. Foà
 La Lanzichenecca by Vincenzo di Mattia, directed by Virginio Puecher, Compagnia del Piccolo Teatro di Milano, 1964
 Eracle by Euripide, translated by Salvatore Quasimodo, directed by Giuseppe Di Martino, Istituto Nazionale del Dramma Antico, Teatro Greco di Siracusa
 Andromaca by Euripide, directed by Mario Ferrero, Istituto Nazionale del Dramma Antico, Teatro Greco di Siracusa
 Canti e poesie della libertà, directed by Raffaele Maiello, testi a cura di Arnoldo Foà e Gigi Lunari, Teatro Lirico di Milano, 1965
 Re Cervo da Carlo Gozzi, directed by Andrea Camilleri
 Ruy Blas by Victor Hugo, directed by Mario Ferrero, Teatro Duse di Bologna, 1966
 Il testimone by A. Foà, directed by Arnoldo Foà, Teatro Duse di Bologna
 La stanza degli Ospiti by Brunello Rondi, directed by A. Foà, Teatro della Cometa
 I Menecmi by Plauto, translated by Ettore Paratore, directed by Accursio Di Leo, Istituto Nazionale del Dramma Antico
 La Pace by Aristofane, directed by A. Foà, Istituto Nazionale del Dramma Antico, 1967
 Zio Vania by Anton Checov, directed by Pietro Sharoff, Teatro Centrale di Roma, 1968
 Golem by Alessandro Fersen, directed by A. Fersen, E.T.I. Teatro La Pergola di Firenze, 1969
 Malatesta by Henry de Montherlant, translated by Mario Moretti, directed by José Quaglio

1970s
 Il Burbero Benefico by Carlo Goldoni, directed by Carlo Lodovici, ripresa televisiva 22 dicembre 1970
 Diana e la Tuda by L. Pirandello, directed by Arnoldo Foà, Teatro Stabile di Palermo, 1971
 Flavia e le sue Bambole by Salvato Cappelli, directed by Giorgio Prosperi, Fondazione Andrea Biondo Compagnia Stabile di Palermo
 The entertainer by John Osborne, directed by Arnoldo Foà, Compagnia Teatro San Babila di Milano, 1972
 Per una giovinetta che nessuno piange by Renato Mainardi, directed by Arnoldo Foà
 Lisistrata by Aristofane, directed by Daniele D’Anza, Istituto Nazionale del Dramma Antico, Teatro Greco di Siracusa
 Vecchi vuoti a rendere by Maurizio Costanzo, directed by Arnoldo Foà, Teatro Valle 1973
 Miles Gloriosus by Plauto, trad. e ridu. di A. Foà, directed by A. Foà, Compagnia Attori Riuniti
 L’estro del Poeta by Eugene O’Neill, directed by Enrico Colosimo
 La folle Amanda by Pierre Barillet e Jean-Pierre Gredy, directed by Arnoldo Foà, Compagnia del Teatro Comico, Teatro Duse di Bologna, 1974
 Maschere Nude by L. Pirandello, directed by Lambreto Puggelli, Compagnia del Teatro San Babila, 1975
 Farsa d’amore e di gelosia by Mario Amendola e Bruno Corbucci, directed by Filippo Crivelli, Teatro Nuovo di Milano 1976
 Un angelo calibro 9 by Nino Marino, directed by A. Foà, Theatritalia/Compagnia del Momento Teatrale, Teatro Duse di Bologna, 1977–1978
 La Roba da G. Verga, directed by A. Mazzone
 Quella della porta accanto by Nino Marino, directed by A. Foà
 Diana e la Tuda by L. Pirandello, directed by Arnoldo Foà, con A. Foà, Teatro Parioli di Roma, 1979

1980s
 Il lebbroso by Giancarlo Menotti, directed by Giancarlo Menotti, Festival dei Due Mondi, 1980
 Il teatro comico by Carlo Goldoni, directed by Augusto Zucchi
 Questa sera si recita a soggetto by Luigi Pirandello, regia Marco Parodi, Cooperativa Teatro di Sardegna, 1982
 Le Supplici by Eschilo, regia Otomar Krejca, Greek Theatre of Syracuse
 L’Angelo Azzurro, adapted by Aldo Trionfo e Alessandro Giupponi dal testo di Heinrich Mann, directed by Alessandro Giupponi, 1983
 Il Settimo Sigillo (da Dipinto su legno by Ingmar Bergman), directed by Lucio Chiavarelli, Festival di Borgio Verezzi, 1984
 Diana e la Tuda by Luigi Pirandello, directed by A. Foà
 La corda a tre capi by A. Foà, directed by Arnoldo Foà, Astec - Teatro Stabile dei Giovani
 Fiorenza by Thomas Mann, directed by Aldo Trionfo (con la collaborazione di Lorenzo Salveti), 1986
 Otello by Giuseppe Verdi (opera lirica), directed by Arnoldo Foà, Auditorium di Cagliari
 La Tosca by Victorien Sardou, adattamento e directed by Aldo Trionfo,  di Napoli, 1988
 La palla al piede by Georges Feydeau, directed by Armando Pugliese, Teatro Quirino di Roma
 Un pezzo di paradiso by Steve J. Spears, directed by A. Foà, 

1990s
 Don Giovanni e Faust by Christian Dietrich Grabbe, directed by Gino Zampieri, Festival del Teatro Classico, Borgio Verezzi, 1990
 L’Ultimo Viaggio di Pirandello by B. Belfiore, directed by P. Gazzara, 1991
 Adelchi by A. Manzoni, directed by Federico Tiezzi, produzione Teatro Biondo di Palermo e Teatro Argentina di Roma, Teatro Biondo di Palermo, 1992
 La bottega del caffè by C. Goldoni, directed by Mario Missiroli, Produzione Teatro Argentina di Roma
 La Pace by Aristofane, trad. di Raffaele Cantarella, adattamento e directed by A. Foà, Teatro Olimpico di Vicenza
 Il Corsaro (dal Decamerone di Boccaccio) di Fausto Tapergi, directed by Marco Carniti, 1993–1994
 Aulularia by Plauto, directed by Renato Giordano, Teatro Romano di Ostia Antica
 Aminta by Torquato Tasso, directed by Luca Ronconi, Produzione Teatro di Roma
 Una serata per l'impresario teatrale directed by Stefano Mazzonis, Trittico di 3 opere buffe: Il maestro di cappella by D.Cimarosa e Epitaffi sparsi by Ennio Morricone, e L'impresario teatrale by W. A. Mozart. Orchestra Pro Arte Marche diretta da Bruno Rigacci. 1997
 La signora della musica by André Ernotte e Elliot Tiber, adattamento e directed by A. Foà, Cantiere Internazionale d’Arte di Montepulciano e Cubatea, 1998
 La rivoluzione di Frà Tommaso Campanella by Mario Moretti, directed by Mario Moretti, Teatro Ghione di Roma, 1999
 Diana e la Tuda by Luigi Pirandello, directed by A. Foà, produzione La Pirandelliana, Teatro Franco Parenti di Milano
 Tutti gli uomini del deficiente directed by Paolo Costella, 1999

2000s
 Amphitryon Toujours by Arnoldo Foà, directed by Arnoldo Foà, produzione La Pirandelliana, Spoleto Festival 2000, 2000
 Ultimo giorno di un condannato a morte, di Giovanni De Feudis, directed by Giovanni De Feudis (da Le dernier jour d’un condamné by Victor Hugo)
 L’Igiene dell’Assassino by Amélie Nothomb, directed by Andrea Dosio, Torino Spettacoli, Teatro Erba di Torino, 2001
 ll Vantone by Pier Paolo Pasolini (dal Miles Gloriosus by Plautus), directed by Pino Quartullo
 Colpevole innocenza by Ronald Harwood, directed by Arnoldo Foà, Compagnia Mario Chiocchio, Teatro Greco di Roma
 Pluto by Aristofanes, adattamento e directed by A. Foà, 2002
 Duse/D’Annunzio by Barbara Amodio, directed by Angelo Gallo
 Novecento by Alessandro Baricco, directed by Gabriele Vacis, Produzione Mondrian Kilroy Fund e Irma Spettacoli, 2003–2004
 Oggi by Arnoldo Foà, directed by A. Foà, con A. Foà, produzione La Pirandelliana, Teatro Ghione di Roma, 2005
 Patrizia, il Musical, di Arnoldo Foà, Teatro Sistina
 Sul lago dorato by Ernest Thompson (adattamento di Nino Marino), directed by Maurizio Panici, produzione La Pirandelliana, Festival di Borgio Verezzi 2006
 Scene dalla vita di Mozart testo di Lorenzo Arruga, musica di Albert Lortzing, regia Dan Jemmett, direzione musicale Paolo Arrivabeni, con Arnoldo Foà, Teatro Comunale di Bologna
 Io, Arturo Toscanini, di Piero Melograni, directed by Giulio Farnese, Teatro Politeama Pratese, 2007

Selected filmography

 Un giorno nella vita (1946)
 The Testimony (1946)
 The Opium Den (1947)
 L'eroe della strada (1948)
 Il Brigante Musolino (1950)
 The Merry Widower (1950)
 Toto the Sheik (1950)
 Tomorrow Is Another Day (1951)
 Beauties on Bicycles (1951)
 Lorenzaccio (1951)
 Red Love (1952)
 Ivan, Son of the White Devil (1953)
 Love in a Hot Climate (1954)
 Cardinal Lambertini (1954)
 Toto and Carolina (1955)
 Supreme Confession (1956)
 The Courier of Moncenisio (1956)
 The Silent Enemy (1958)
 The Adventures of Nicholas Nickleby (1958, TV series)
 The Angel Wore Red (1960)
 Barabbas (1961) - Joseph of Arimathea
 Damon and Pythias (1962)
 War Gods of Babylon (1962)
 The Trial (1962)
 The Shoes of the Fisherman (1968)
 Cause of Divorce (1972)
 Il domestico (1974)
 The Devil Is a Woman (1974)
 Cento giorni a Palermo (1984)
 All the Moron's Men (1999)
 Gente di Roma (2003)
 The Good Pope: Pope John XXIII (2003)
 Do You Mind If I Kiss Mommy? (2003)
 Up'' (2009) - Charles F. Muntz (Italian version)

References

External links

1916 births
2014 deaths
Actors from Ferrara
Actors from Florence
Italian people of Jewish descent
Jewish Italian writers
Italian male film actors
Italian male stage actors
Italian male radio actors
Italian male voice actors
Italian theatre directors
Centro Sperimentale di Cinematografia alumni
Nastro d'Argento winners
20th-century Italian male actors
21st-century Italian male actors
20th-century Italian male singers
20th-century Italian male writers
Respiratory disease deaths in Lazio
Deaths from respiratory failure
Burials in the Protestant Cemetery, Rome